Portraits is an album by the Gerald Wilson Orchestra recorded in late 1963 and early 1964 and released on the Pacific Jazz label.

Reception

AllMusic rated the album with 4 stars; in his review, Scott Yanow said: "this was a very impressive unit although now somewhat underrated".

Track listing 
All compositions by Gerald Wilson except as indicated
 "So What" (Miles Davis) - 5:55
 "Caprichos" - 6:55
 "Paco" - 6:10
 "Ravi" - 5:53
 "Aram" - 3:43
 "'Round Midnight" (Thelonious Monk) - 5:10
 "Eric" - 3:11

Personnel 
Gerald Wilson - arranger and conductor
Jules Chaikin, Freddie Hill, Carmell Jones, Nat Meeks, Al Porcino - trumpet
Bob Edmondson, John Ewing, Lew McCreary (tracks 2, 5 & 7), Lester Robertson (tracks 1, 3, 4 & 6) - trombone
Don Switzer - bass trombone
Bud Shank - flute (track 2)
Joe Maini, Jimmy Woods - alto saxophone
Teddy Edwards, Harold Land - tenor saxophone
Jack Nimitz - baritone saxophone
Jack Wilson - piano
Joe Pass - guitar
Dave Dyson (tracks 2, 5 & 7), Leroy Vinnegar (tracks 1, 3, 4 & 6) - bass
Chuck Carter - drums

References 

Gerald Wilson albums
1964 albums
Pacific Jazz Records albums
Albums arranged by Gerald Wilson
Albums conducted by Gerald Wilson